The Pribina Sailplane Grand Prix was the third qualifying Gliding Grand Prix for the FAI World Grand Prix 2010–2011. The competition was flow in with 18 meter class gliders.

See also 
Pribina Sailplane Grand Prix 2008

External links 
 https://web.archive.org/web/20100529223816/http://www.fai.org/gliding/QSGP2010_2011

Gliding competitions
International sports competitions hosted by Slovakia
2010 in air sports
Aviation history of Slovakia
September 2010 sports events in Europe
2010 in Slovak sport